Čavoj is a village and municipality in Prievidza District in the Trenčín Region of western Slovakia.

History
In historical records the village was first mentioned in 1364.

Geography
The municipality lies at an elevation of 534 metres (1,752 ft) and covers an area of 15.245 km² (5.886 mi²). It has a population of about 577 people.

Genealogical resources

The records for genealogical research are available at the state archive "Statny Archiv in Nitra, Slovakia"

 Roman Catholic church records (births/marriages/deaths): 1865-1901 (parish A)

See also
 List of municipalities and towns in Slovakia

References

External links

 
http://www.statistics.sk/mosmis/eng/run.html
Surnames of living people in Cavoj

Villages and municipalities in Prievidza District